The Shin Sekaï is a French singing / rapping fusion duo made up of Dadju (vocals) and Abou Tall (rap). The band's name means "New World" in Japanese (新世界), and was taken from a fictional territory in the popular manga series One Piece.

Shin Sekaï were signed to French independent label Wati B.  They released two mixtapes in 2015 2013 and 2014 and an album Indéfini in 2016.

After break-up, Dadju released his solo album Gentleman 2.0, whereas Abou Tall is releasing his solo album DLDLVL. Dadju is the brother of rapper Maître Gims, member of the successful French rap group Sexion d'Assaut, a major act of Wati B.

Discography

Albums

Mixtapes

Singles

*Did not appear in the official Belgian Ultratop 50 charts, but rather in the bubbling under Ultratip charts.

Featured in 

*Did not appear in the official Belgian Ultratop 50 charts, but rather in the bubbling under Ultratip charts.

References

External links
Facebook

Rappers from Seine-Saint-Denis